"Time" is a single by the new wave band Music for Pleasure. It was released in 1983 on Polydor.

Track listing
All songs written and composed by Mark Copson, Christopher Oldroyd, Ivor Roberts and David Whitaker.

Polydor 7" Single: POSP 553

Polydor 12" Single: POSPX 553

Personnel
 Mark Copson – voice
 Christopher Oldroyd – drums
 Ivor Roberts – bass guitar
 David Whitaker – synthesizer

Production
 John Brand – producer
 Stylorouge – artwork

References

1983 songs
Music for Pleasure (band) songs
Polydor Records singles